This article gives an overview of the plant communities formed by vegetation of open habitats in the British National Vegetation Classification system.

Introduction

The open habitat communities of the NVC were described in Volume 5 of British Plant Communities, first published in 2000, along with the three groups of maritime communities (shingle, strandline and sand-dune communities, salt-marsh communities and maritime cliff communities).

In total, 42 open habitat communities have been identified.

The open habitat communities consist of eight distinct subgroups:
 six arable weed and trackside communities of light, less-fertile acid soils (OV1, OV2, OV3, OV4, OV5 and OV6)
 eight arable weed and wasteland communities of fertile loams and clays (OV7, OV8, OV9, OV10, OV11, OV12, OV13 and OV14)
 three arable weed communities of light, limey soils (OV15, OV16 and OV17)
 six gateway, trackside and courtyard communities (OV18, OV19, OV20, OV21, OV22 and OV23)
 four tall-herb weed communities (OV24, OV25, OV26 and OV27)
 five communities typical of periodically inundated habitats  (OV28, OV29, OV30, OV32 and OV33)
 four dwarf-rush communities of ephemeral ponds (OV31, OV34, OV35 and OV36)
 six communities of crevice, scree and spoil vegetation  (OV37, OV38, OV39, OV40, OV41 and OV42)

List of open habitat communities

The following is a list of the communities that make up this category:

 OV1 Viola arvensis - Aphanes microcarpa community
 OV2 Briza minor - Silene gallica community
 OV3 Papaver rhoeas - Viola arvensis community
 OV4 Chrysanthemum segetum - Spergula arvensis community
 OV5 Digitaria ischaemum - Erodium cicutarium community
 OV6 Cerastium glomeratum - Fumaria muralis ssp. boraei community
 OV7 Veronica persica - Veronica polita community
 OV8 Veronica persica - Alopecurus myosuroides community
 OV9 Matricaria perforata - Stellaria media community
 OV10 Poa annua - Senecio vulgaris community
 OV11 Poa annua - Stachys arvensis community
 OV12 Poa annua - Myosotis arvensis community
 OV13 Stellaria media - Capsella bursa-pastoris community
 OV14 Urtica urens - Lamium amplexicaule community
 OV15 Anagallis arvensis - Veronica persica community
 OV16 Papaver rhoeas - Silene noctiflora community
 OV17 Reseda lutea - Polygonum aviculare community
 OV18 Polygonum aviculare - Chamomilla suavolens community
 OV19 Poa annua - Matricaria perforata community
 OV20 Poa annua - Sagina procumbens community
 OV21 Poa annua - Plantago major community
 OV22 Poa annua - Taraxacum officinale community
 OV23 Lolium perenne - Dactylis glomerata community
 OV24 Urtica dioica - Galium aparine community
 OV25 Urtica dioica - Cirsium arvense community
 OV26 Epilobium hirsutum community
 OV27 Epilobium angustifolium community
 OV28 Agrostis stolonifera - Ranunculus repens community
 OV29 Alopecurus geniculatus - Rorippa palustris community
 OV30 Bidens tripartita - Polygonum amphibium community
 OV31 Rorippa palustris - Filaginella uliginosa community
 OV32 Myosotis scorpioides - Ranunculus sceleratus community
 OV33 Polygonum lapathifolium - Poa annua community
 OV34 Allium schoenoprasum - Plantago maritima community
 OV35 Lythrum portula - Ranunculus flammula community
 OV36 Lythrum hyssopifolia - Juncus bufonius community
 OV37 Festuca ovina - Minuartia verna community
 OV38 Gymnocarpium robertianum - Arrhenatherum elatius community
 OV39 Asplenium trichomanes - Asplenium ruta-muraria community
 OV40 Asplenium viride - Cystopteris fragilis community
 OV41 Parietaria diffusa community
 OV42 Cymbalaria muralis community